Qurutob (sometimes kurutob) is a dish of Tajik cuisine. Sometimes described as a "bread salad", it is created using qurut, dried balls of cheese, which are soaked in water; the resulting liquid, salty in flavor, is used as the base of the dish. Strips of fatir, a type of flatbread, are then placed on top. The mixture is served on large plates, and is usually topped with a variety of vegetables, such as onions, cucumbers, tomatoes, or herbs; meat or chili peppers are also sometimes seen as garnishes. Qurutob is a shared dish, meant to be eaten with the hands.

Qurutob is the national dish of Tajikistan.

References

Tajik cuisine
National dishes
Bread dishes